Sir Robert Bartlett Elliott  (3 January 1934 – 21 August 2020) was a New Zealand medical researcher.

Born in Adelaide, South Australia, on 3 January 1934, Elliott was educated at Adelaide High School, and studied medicine at the University of Adelaide from 1951 to 1956. After working as a house surgeon in Blenheim, New Zealand, he trained in paediatric medicine in Adelaide and Denver, Colorado. He was appointed as a senior lecturer at Adelaide in 1963, and in 1970 he moved to the University of Auckland School of Medicine as the foundation professor of paediatrics.

In the 1999 New Year Honours, Elliott was appointed a Companion of the New Zealand Order of Merit, for services to medical research. He was promoted to Knight Companion of the New Zealand Order of Merit, also for services to medical research, in the 2020 Queen's Birthday Honours.

Elliott died at his home in Auckland on 21 August 2020 at the age of 86.

References

1934 births
2020 deaths
Scientists from Adelaide
University of Adelaide alumni
Australian emigrants to New Zealand
Academic staff of the University of Auckland
Australian paediatricians
New Zealand paediatricians
New Zealand medical researchers
Knights Companion of the New Zealand Order of Merit
People educated at Adelaide High School